Mieczysławów  is a village in the administrative district of Gmina Krzyżanów, within Kutno County, Łódź Voivodeship, in central Poland.

The town was the site of a large armored battle during World War II, involving the 2nd SS Panzer Division Das Reich and elements of Polish armored units.

References

Villages in Kutno County